State Disaster Response Force Assam or SDRF ASSAM is a 
Specialized Force raised on 15 December 2011 with the objective of carrying out rescue and relief operations in a quick and effective manner during any natural and man-made disaster. It is headed by Special Director General of Police Satyendra Narayan Singh (IPS), and headquartered in Guwahati, Assam.

Organizational structure 

SDRF Assam comes under direct control of Department of Home Affairs, Government of Assam. It is headed by a Special Director General of Police.

This force mainly responds quickly to disasters like Flood, Earthquake, Road Accident, Train Accident, Chemical, Biological, Radiological, Nuclear etc. The State Disaster Response Force Assam is equipped with various types of modern Equipments to tackle any natural and man-made disaster.

History 

As per Section 3.4.5 of National Policy on Disaster Management 2009, the state governments in India are required to raise their own SDRF for quick response to disasters, and as a result, the Assam Government raised the SDRF Assam on 15 December 2011, and attached it to Fire and emergency services Assam, a branch of the Assam Police.

Battalion and Reserved Forces 

There are 03 Companies of SDRF Battalion in different parts of Assam and 2 more Companies building is under construction. Apart from the 3 Coys of Assam State Disaster Response Force the teams of this force are deployed at the Fire stations of various districts of the state. There are approximately 10 SDRF personnel deployed in every district of Assam.

Selection and training  

All SDRF Assam personnel are selected by State Level Police recruitment Board Assam.The Basic qualification to Join as a Constable is 12th Pass( Twelfth grade ) in Science stream. Officers of SDRF Assam is Selected by Assam Public Service Commission.  All the SDRF Constable (Emergency Rescuer) and officers are from the technical background. The Selection standard of SDRF Constable/ Emergency Rescuer is Same as a Constable of Assam Police Radio Organization (APRO).

The newly recruited Constable must go for 4 months basic Police training in Assam Police Betalion or training centres where they will get the Arms and Law and order training. 

After the Basic Police training the SDRF Assam personal must go for the 6 months technical or Trade training where personnel are invariably trained in courses like Flood Rescue, Collapsed Structure Search and Rescue, Mountain Training, Medical First Responders, Swimming, Rope rescue, Nuclear, Biological and Chemical Emergencies; Dignified Disposal of Dead Bodies etc. 

The further training includes : 

 Under Water Diving Course and Salvage Operation at S.E.I., Kolkata
 T.O.T. Course on M.F.R & C.S.S.R
 Disaster Management Training at N.C.D.C., Nagpur.

Roles & Responsibilities

State Disaster Response Force Assam is responsible for providing immediate rescue and relief services during natural or man-made disasters. The primary objective of the SDRF Assam is to minimize the loss of life and property and to ensure speedy restoration of essential services in the affected areas. 

The SDRF Assam is responsible for responding to various types of disasters, including floods, earthquakes, landslides, fire incidents, Accidents etc.. The force operates in close coordination with other disaster management agencies, such as the Indian Army, National Disaster Response Force, and local police.

The SDRF Assam personal are also involved in Law and Order duties, Water petrolling Duties, VIP Duties etc.. 

In addition to providing immediate rescue and relief services, the SDRF Assam also plays an important role in disaster preparedness and mitigation efforts. This includes conducting regular training and awareness programs for the local community, as well as providing technical support for disaster risk reduction and management activities.

Operations 

The SDRF Assam is a 'Specialized Force' constituted for the purpose of special response to any natural and man-made disaster. As a specialised force, it is intended to be used as a First Responder of various disasters including the drowning cases, Earthquake, building collapses, landslides, devastating floods and Cyclones. 
Due to its tropical monsoon climate, the state of Assam is prone to annual flooding, Since 2011 SDRF Assam is the first responder to carry out Rescue operation during Floods.

Major Operation by SDRF ASSAM 

Some of the major response operations of SDRF Assam as below:

Dikhow River Car Drawing Incident, Sivasagar 

• Incident Date - 1st September 2018

The Incident - Five members of the same family were victim of this tragic incident. The car had fallen into the Dikhow River, near Nakotonia Goan, Sivasagar, Assam.

Search and Rescue operation: The rescue operation started on the very day of occurrence, by SDRF Assam team of Sivasagar. Public opinion snowballed and the operation became a joint team effort by the personnel from various agencies- SDRF, NDRF, Indian Naval Diving teams and Indian Army.

Result: The car & the bodies of the victims were retrieved on 5th Sep/2018. The car was first spotted by SDRF Assam team including ER Dilip Orang, ER Suren Orang and ER Pankaj Subba in extremely challenging and hazardous condition.

Drowning of Passenger boat in Brahmaputra River near North Guwahati

• Incident Date: 5th September, 2018

The Incident: A mechanized country boat carrying about 50 passengers along with 7 nos. motor cycles and 2 nos. by-cycles capsized and sank in Brahmaputra river near North Guwahati. According to eye witnesses, the boat collided with concrete Pillars of barrage constructed by JAICA water project after the boat stopped functioning and sank in river just about two hundred meters before it could reach the shore near Aswaklanta Temple in North Guwahati.

Nimatighat Boat Accident 

• Incident Date : 8 September 2021

The Incident : The tragic accident occurred when the private boat 'Ma Kamala' was headed to Majuli from Nimati Ghat and ferry 'Tripkai', operated by the state's Inland Water Transport (IWT) Department, was coming from the riverine island. Three persons died when a private boat with 100 people on board capsized and sank in the Brahmaputra. SDRF ASSAM team quickly started the rescue mission and rescued almost 90 peoples.

Haflong Landslide 

• Incident Date - 15 May 2022

The Incident : Heavy rains in Dima Hasao district caused mudslides.Debris is strewn on railway tracks throughout the district. The Barak Valley, one of the three major regions of Assam besides the Brahmaputra Valley and the North Cachar Hills, has been cut off from the rest of the North East due to the damage to rail and road infrastructure. SDRF Assam Team alone Rescues 1000 peoples.

Dhubri boat accident 

• Incident Date - 29 September 2022

The Incident - The incident took place around 11am on 29 September 2022 when a team from the Dhubri circle office were on a visit to inspect erosion near an under construction bridge. A circle officer was reported missing after a boat with at least 28 people on board sank in a channel of the Brahmaputra River in western Assam’s Dhubri district. While some passengers managed to swim to safety, others were rescued by State Disaster Response Force Assam (SDRF).

Medals and awards 

The Emergency Rescuers ( ER ) Of SDRF Assam Bn got many awards and medals for their outstanding and meritorious service. Many personal of SDRF Assam, laid down their lives during the rescue operations.

List of receivers for 2020 Chief Minister's Police Medal:

 ER – 27 Dilip Urang, SDRF, Assam
 ER – 21 Pankaj Subba, SDRF, Assam
 ER – 52 Prag Bora, SDRF, Assam
 ER – 127 Devison Chutia, SDRF, Assam
 ER – 35 Amit Choudhury, SDRF, Assam

See also 

 Assam Police
 National Disaster Response Force
 Odisha Disaster Rapid Action Force
 State Disaster Response Force Uttarakhand
 State Disaster Response Force Gujarat

References 

Government of Assam
Government agencies established in 2011
Disaster Response Forces in India